2013 Stockholm riots may refer to:
May 2013 Stockholm riots (Husby), between security forces and immigrant youth
December 2013 Stockholm riots (Kärrtorp), between anti-fascist and neo-Nazi activists